The Welsh Rugby Union Division Three South West (also called the SWALEC Division Three South West for sponsorship reasons) is a rugby union league in Wales.

Competition format and sponsorship

Competition
There are 12 clubs in the WRU Division Three South West. During the course of a season (which lasts from September to May) each club plays the others twice, once at their home ground and once at that of their opponents for a total of 22 games for each club, with a total of 132 games in each season. Teams receive four points for a win and two point for a draw, an additional bonus point is awarded to either team if they score four tries or more in a single match. No points are awarded for a loss though the losing team can gain a bonus point for finishing the match within seven points of the winning team.  Teams are ranked by total points, then the number of tries scored and then points difference. At the end of each season, the club with the most points is crowned as champion. If points are equal the tries scored then points difference determines the winner. The team who is declared champion at the end of the season is eligible for promotion to the WRU Division Two West. The two lowest placed teams are relegated to the WRU Division Four South West.

Sponsorship 
In 2008 the Welsh Rugby Union announced a new sponsorship deal for the club rugby leagues with SWALEC valued at £1 million (GBP). The initial three year sponsorship was extended at the end of the 2010/11 season, making SWALEC the league sponsors until 2015. The leagues sponsored are the WRU Divisions one through to seven.

 (2002–2005) Lloyds TSB
 (2005–2008) Asda
 (2008–2015) SWALEC

2011/2012 Season

League teams
 Aberavon Green Stars RFC
 Brynamman RFC
 Bryncoch RFC
 BP Llandarcy RFC
 Maesteg Harlequins RFC
 Morriston RFC
 Mumbles RFC
 Pencoed RFC
 Seven Sisters RFC
 Taibach RFC
 Ystalyfera RFC
 Vardre RFC

2011/2012 Table

2010/2011 Season

League teams
 Aberavon Green Stars RFC
 Brynamman RFC
 Bryncoch RFC
 Cwmavon RFC
 Glynneath RFC
 Kenfig Hill RFC
 Morriston RFC
 Nantyffyllon RFC
 Pencoed RFC
 Seven Sisters RFC
 Taibach RFC
 Ystalyfera RFC

2010/2011 Table

2009/2010 Season

League teams
 Briton Ferry RFC
 Bryncoch RFC
 Brynamman RFC
 Cwmavon RFC
 Glynneath RFC
 Kenfig Hill RFC
 Maesteg Harlequins RFC
 Nantyffyllon RFC
 Seven Sisters RFC
 Skewen RFC
 Tondu RFC
 Ystalyfera RFC

2009/2010 Table

2008/2009 Season

League teams
 Aberavon Quins RFC
 Briton Ferry RFC
 Glynneath RFC
 Kenfig Hill RFC
 Maesteg Celtic RFC
 Maesteg Harlequins RFC
 Morriston RFC
 Nantyffyllon RFC
 Seven Sisters RFC
 Skewen RFC
 Tondu RFC
 Tonna RFC

2008/2009 Table

2007/2008 Season 
BP Llandarcy were named champions at the end of the season and were promoted to Division Two West. Vadre were relegated to Division Four South West for finishing second from last while Banwen dropped two leagues to Division Five Central for failing to raise a team on more than one occasion.

League teams
 Aberavon Quins RFC
 Banwen RFC
 BP RFC
 Briton Ferry RFC
 Kenfig Hill RFC
 Maesteg Harlequins RFC
 Nantyffyllon RFC
 Seven Sisters RFC
 Skewen RFC
 Tondu RFC
 Tonna RFC
 Vadre RFC

2007/2008 Table 

* Banwen RFC failed to raise a team on more than one occasion and were relegated to division five. All matches played against opposition in Division Three South West were declared null and void.

2006/2007 Season

League teams
 Aberavon Quins RFC
 Amman United RFC
 Banwen RFC
 Brynammon RFC
 Bryncoch RFC
 Cwmgors RFC
 Heol y Cyw RFC
 Kenfig Hill RFC
 Mumbles RFC
 Nantyffyllon RFC
 Skewen RFC
 Tondu RFC
 Vadre RFC

2006/2007 Table

References

5